During its history the Toyota Supra has enjoyed considerable success in a variety of different motorsports.

Drag racing 
The Supra has a history of professional drag racing, mainly in Japan and the United States. The HKS team have used both the Mk III and Mk IV to showcase its products, known as the HKS Drag Supra. This Supra was driven by Charlie Goncalves Catanho.

One of the first Pro Mod drivers in import drag racing, Vinny Ten used a Supra to hold national records for drag racing in the United States between 1997 and 2000 as well as being the first in the US to build a  Japanese engine without the need of nitrous or alcohol fuel. Ten has since taken his Supra into the six second barrier.

Craig Paisley, another pioneer of sport compact drag racing, also used a nitrous-assisted Supra, his first sport compact, to compete in the same category. Paisley was also the first sport compact racer to receive factory sponsorship and support. Toyota became the first Japanese car company to get involved with drag racing.

The Supra won all but the first round, losing a final to Yallon.  With the cancellation of the Street Tire Class, Titan moved to the Pro RWD class with a 2JZ-GTE-powered Celica  The Supra was used by BF Goodrich to advertise its Drag Radials tires which it was equipped with.

Many cars that appeared in the series also appeared in the NDRA (NOPI Drag Racing Association) BF Goodrich Tires Pro Street Tire Series.

Sriyantha Weerasuria and Boost Logic were able to achieve a  pass at the Texas Mile and a 7.91 seconds at  quarter mile pass with the stock Getrag V160 transmission. Weerasuria also holds the record for the fasted quarter mile in a manual transmission vehicle (which was done in a Supra). 

The car was driven by Kean Wang.

The record is now held by Ebrahim Kanoo of Bahrain with driver, Gary White. Both cars were built and tuned by Titan Motorsports.

Touring car 
During the Group A period, Toyota used the Mk II for Division 3 category touring car racing, especially in the JTCC, ETCC, BTCC and ATCC with the AE86 competing in Division 1.

The Mk II Celica Supras debuted in August 1981, although relatively underpowered to be a serious contender against the Rover SD1 and BMW 635CSI, managed to be competitive despite this, being driven by drivers such as Win Percy winning a BTCC round, at Brands Hatch

When its star driver, Percy, was tempted away by rival Tom Walkinshaw and his TWR-prepared Jaguar XJS V12, Toyota GB took on Grand Prix motorcycle racing star Barry Sheene, following his retirement from motorcycle racing, for the 1985 BTCC season, but the car was outclassed by the newer turbocharged cars and Sheene's performance was hampered by past motorcycle racing injuries. Nevertheless, he drew in the crowds and  retired from professional racing at the end of the season. Later the Toyota Team GB Supra was shipped to a privateer in Australia where it won the first Group A race on the continent.

The Mk II was replaced by the Mk III Supra which, like the Mk II, had varying degrees of success, but both TOM'S and SARD, who competed only in 1988, fared better in Japan with the TOM'S team winning its debut, at the Sugo Track, on September 9, 1987. In all, eleven MA70 Group-A turbos were built by TRD Japan for racing. In 1987 the Turbo MK III was fairly competitive in Japan - it not only  won its debut race, but also for the remainder of the race season the Supras outqualified all Nissan Skylines (DR30) in  Division 3 of the JTCC. After the FIA increased the weight multiplication factor from 1.4 to 1.7, the MK III lost competitiveness as the rest of the Division 3 cars were mostly running 2.0 or 2.5 L engines, increasing weight differences. Additionally, unreliable long-stroke engines, homologation delays and poor development caused a further decline of the car as the Ford Sierra Cosworth RS500 and the more advanced Nissan Skyline GT-R became the cars to have in top flight Group A racing. The Supra was abandoned at the end of the 1990 season in favour of the Toyota Corolla AE101 in 1991, and only a few were kept in competition by privateers until the end of the season.

Production Car racing 
Peter Fitzgerald won the 1989 Australian Production Car Championship driving a Toyota Supra Turbo.

Rallying 
Although the Celica and Corolla Levin represented Toyota in rallying, the touring car spec Celica Supra was used occasionally in Group A with modifications to make it drivable. The Celica Supra managed to finish second in category at Circuit of Ireland Ulster Rally, Scottish Rally and the Welsh Rally during the 1983 British Open Rally Championship, driven by Per Eklund and Dave Whittock, allowing them to successfully defend their championship title.

Toyota sold the car off after the 1985 season.

Following the demise of Group B and upon insistence by Toyota management, its rally entrant Toyota Team Europe used the Supra to specialize in African rallies while the lighter Celica took the job for the other rallies. The Supra 3.0i made Toyota's Group A debut with the Supra which was capable of producing , despite its weight and size being a clear disadvantage, driven by Björn Waldegaard, it led the 1987 Safari Rally until its final day when its engine overheated. The Supra
scored its only win in the Hong Kong - Beijing Rally with the same driver. The NA version was shortly replaced by the  turbo version, which on its debut at the Rallye Côte d'Ivoire, the Supra led but the team withdrew when their hired Cessna 340 crashed, killing the team manager, Henry Liddon and his assistant, Nigel Harris, plus a pilot and navigator.  TTE would return for its African attempt for the following two years but was unable to repeat its performance and was replaced by the Celica which achieved better successes there.

A naturally aspirated, privately entered A80 Supra competed in SCCA ProRally series in 1996 to 1998.

Sportscar racing

IMSA 
Feeling that the car needs to be developed, it underwent further redesign by aerodynamicist Hiro Fujimori.

For the 1985 season, AAR specially adapted a 2.1-liter turbocharged 4T-GT engine to one of their GTU car to be used at the GTO category, which scored a win at Laguna Seca, that car would later be used for engine development. Despite heavy competition against the RX-7s, by the time they progressed to the higher GTO category in 1986 with a Celica, they had taken 10 GTU victories.

SCCA and NASA 

The MKIV Supra is classed in the SCCA Grand Touring 2 (GT2) class using a Lexus 3UZ-FE 4.3 V8 engine, and in Touring 1 (T1) using the original 2JZ-GTE engine. Amir Haleem is the only known competitor with this car based in the San Francisco Region.

Amir also competed with a 2JZ-GTE powered Supra in the 2015 NASA Super Touring 2 class, setting the second fastest lap time in the Western Championship race before running out of fuel towards the end of the race.

GT4 

The Toyota GR Supra GT4 was designed and produced by Toyota Gazoo Racing Europe GmbH in Cologne, Germany that was designed for the GT4 European Series. Launched in 2020, the first customers of this car were Classic & Modern Racing, Speedworks Motorsport and Ring Racing.

U.S. Super Lap Battles 

Matt Andrews piloted Curtis Chen's Mk IV Supra to a win at the 2008 Super Lap Battle Finals in the Street RWD division with a time of  1:57:711.
Previously his car took home overall street class in 2006.

Magazine Challenges 
Matt Andrews and Al Rhee piloted Curtis Chen's Mk IV Supra in the road racing and drag racing tests representing Super Street Magazine for the 2010 Castrol Syntec Top Car Challenge. The Team came in first place followed by a Modified R35 GTR.

JGTC/Super GT 

Since first appearing in 1994, Toyota has raced the JZA80 Supra as a GT500 race car in the JGTC series. Beginning with a four-cylinder 2.1-liter turbocharged 4T-GTE mounted onto a stock bodyshell with wide arch body kit and spoiler.

Over the years, as demands for expensive GT1 race specials became common, the JGTC regulation drifted away from FIA rules, as a result, the Supra has progressively underwent numerous changes over the years, most noticeable, the numerous body changes and by the late 1990s, the Supra used a developed version of the 3SG, which was developed from the IMSA engine and similar to the 3SGTE engine found in the Toyota Corolla WRC car.
By the early 2000s, for the benefit of torque, the Supra moved on to 3UZ-FE V8 engine.

Altogether, the Supra has taken the drivers' title five times in 1997, 2001, 2002, 2005, and 2021, and the teams' title two times in 1997 and 1999. Despite being out of production since 2002, factory teams continued to use JZA80 Supras with continued successes. The car's swansong competitive year was in 2006, when it was used by Toyota Team Tsuchiya and Toyota Team SARD. From 2007 till 2019, Toyota was represented in the GT500 by its luxury brand Lexus and its line of GT cars, such as the SC430 and LC500. However, from 2020 onwards, Toyota began using the Supra again in both the GT500 and GT300 series.

In 2000, the Falken team entered the 24 Hours Nürburgring race with the 2-liter turbo version. Modified for the race around the clock the car made it up to the 6th place when an accident ended its race in the early morning.

In 2020, the Supra returned to the GT500 class in Super GT, replacing the Lexus LC. GT300 team Saitama Toyopet GreenBrave also introduced a V8 engined GT300-spec Supra for 2020, replacing the Mark X that the team had fielded since 2017. Both GT500 and GT300 iterations took victory in their respective classes at the first race of the 2020 season in Fuji.

In the 2021 Super GT Series, the Toyota Supra GT500 raced by TGR Team au Tom's won the 2021 Championship in the GT500 class, driven by Yuhi Sekiguchi and Sho Tsuboi. The team overcame a 16-point deficit in the final round of the season to win the championship.

Le Mans 
The JGTC specification Supra made its Le Mans debut in 1995 by the factory backed SARD team which it finished 14th, the team returned again for the following year which they did not finish.

Supra HV-R 

The Supra HV-R is a hybrid race car based on the Super GT Supra jointly developed by Toyota and Toyota Team SARD. The car weighs .

The Denso SARD Supra HV-R became the first hybrid race car in history to win a race when Toyota Team SARD took first place in the Tokachi 24-hour, a Super Taikyu race, on July 16, 2007.  The car completed 616 laps, 19 laps ahead of the second-place finisher.

Drifting 

Toyota Supra was used for top level drifting events, most notably Manabu Orido, the D1GP judge turned competitor, who, for personal reasons, chose the JZA80 to be his personal car and his own racecar of Super GT series and Rhys Millen, who briefly converted his Supra race car for use in drift events before selling it on and switching to the works Pontiac GTO.  Fredric Aasbø has been driving Supras in both Norwegian and US drifting events since 2008, Mark Luney has also prepared a high-powered Supra to compete within UK events in 2010. Some of the most notorious Supras built for drifting in Europe belong to the Russian owned team called Evil Empire, with its headquarters in Sankt Petersburg, and Sergey Kabargin as one of the main drivers. 

The body work design is designed by fellow D1GP commentator Manabu Suzuki. During the 2005 season, Orido finished 12th overall, managing a second-place finish at Ebisu and two other points finishes. His professional drifting career ended abruptly during a transportation accident, when en route to an Advan Drift Meeting, a sleeping truck driver collided into the back of the truck containing the RS-R Supra, severely damaging the car's front end. When informed, Orido was relieved as he saw it as an opportunity to end his drifting career as it took up a lot of his time.

In 2010, a year after Orido returned to D1GP with his Aristo, he once again switched to the JZA80 Supra as his drift car, driving it for two seasons until 2012, where he moved to his current drift car, the new Toyota 86. During his second run with the Supra, Orido did considerably better compared to his 1st  achieving a second-place finish at Okayama and 8th overall in 2010, and 13th overall in 2011 where he also scored a half-points victory at Autopolis, his first recorded victory in D1GP, due to Orido finishing 1st in the qualifying stage after the tsuiso battles were halted because of heavy rain.

Orido's 2005 RS-R Supra also made appearances outside Japan, with Ken Gushi driving the car during the Formula D Invitational Event at Abu Dhabi in 2011, and Orido driving the car again during the first two rounds of the Formula Drift Asia in 2012, with Fredric Aasbø driving the car for the third and last round.

Stock car racing

On July 5, 2018, Toyota announced that the fifth generation Supra will replace the Camry in the 2019 NASCAR Xfinity Series.

On February 23, 2019, Christopher Bell of Joe Gibbs Racing scored the Supra's first NASCAR win at Atlanta. The Supra has since won six out of the first 11 races of the 2019 season, including three from part-time driver Kyle Busch. At the end of the 2021 season, Daniel Hemric drove his Supra to his first win at Phoenix to claim the championship.

Nürburgring history
Japanese tuning company Blitz Tuning teamed up with Racelogic of United Kingdom to take on the non-series/non-road-legal class Nürburgring time in 1997 – they beat it by 4 seconds and claimed the title.

References 

Sports racing cars
Rally cars
24 Hours of Le Mans race cars